John T. Harris (1908-1972) was an American artist and educator. He was born in Philadelphia. He attended the Philadelphia Museum School of Industrial Art and the Tyler School of Art and Architecture. He taught art at the Cheyney State Teachers College.

Early life and education 
Harris was born in Philadelphia in 1908. He received a Master's degree from the Museum School of Art and the Tyler School of Art.

Career 
Harris was a painter, printmaker, and instructor. His work was included in the 2015 exhibition We Speak: Black Artists in Philadelphia, 1920s–1970s at the Woodmere Art Museum.

His work is in the La Salle University Art Museum. His papers are in the Archives of American Art at the Smithsonian Institution.

Harris died in 1972.

References

External links
 images of John T. Harris's work on invaluable

1908 births
1972 deaths
Artists from Philadelphia
American male artists